Firgo is a hamlet close to the town of Whitchurch, Hampshire, England.

Firgo is unusual in that it is only accessible directly from a dual-carriageway, in this case the A34. A crossroad-style junction formed of a gap in the central reservation leads to Firgo in one direction and Tufton Warren in the other.

Villages in Hampshire